Gallium antimonide (GaSb) is a semiconducting compound of gallium and antimony of the III-V family. It has a lattice constant of about 0.61 nm. It has a band gap of 0.67 eV.

History
The intermetallic compound GaSb was first prepared in 1926 by Victor Goldschmidt, who directly combined the elements under an inert gas atmosphere and reported on GaSb's lattice constant, which has since been revised. Goldschmidt also synthesized gallium phosphide and gallium arsenide. The Ga-Sb phase equilibria was investigated in 1955 by Koster and by Greenfield.

Applications
GaSb can be used for Infrared detectors, infrared LEDs and lasers and transistors, and thermophotovoltaic systems.

See also
 Aluminium antimonide
 Indium antimonide
 Gallium arsenide

References

External links
 properties listed at NSM, Ioffe Institute.
 National Compound Semiconductor Roadmap at the Office of Naval Research

III-V semiconductors
Gallium compounds
Antimonides
III-V compounds
Zincblende crystal structure